is a railway station in the town of Kiso, Nagano Prefecture, Japan, operated by Central Japan Railway Company (JR Tōkai).

Lines

Layout
The station has two ground level side platforms. The platforms are not connected within the station, and passengers wishing to change platforms must first exit the station, and use a public overpass to cross the tracks, and re-enter the station from the other side. The station is unattended.

Platforms

Adjacent stations

|-
!colspan=5|

History
Harano Station was opened on 21 April 1955.  On 1 April 1987, it became part of JR Tōkai.

Passenger statistics
In fiscal 2015, the station was used by an average of 63 passengers daily (boarding passengers only).

Surrounding area
Harano Hachiman-gu
Harano Forestry Center

See also

 List of Railway Stations in Japan

References

Railway stations in Japan opened in 1955
Railway stations in Nagano Prefecture
Stations of Central Japan Railway Company
Chūō Main Line
Kiso, Nagano (town)